The Postman from Longjumeau (German: Der Postillon von Lonjumeau) is a 1936 Austrian-Swiss musical comedy film directed by Carl Lamac and starring Carl Esmond, Rose Stradner and Alfred Neugebauer. The film is known by several alternative titles including Der König lächelt – Paris lacht (The King Smiles – Paris Laughs). It is loosely based on the 1836 opera Le postillon de Lonjumeau by Adolphe Adam. In eighteenth-century France, a Postilion from Longjumeau is summoned by Madame de Pompadour to sing in her opera company, forcing him to be separated from his wife.

Cast
 Carl Esmond – Chapelou, the Postman from Lonjumeau
 Rose Stradner – Madelaine
 Alfred Neugebauer – Louis XV of France
 Thekla Ahrens – Marquise de Pompadour
 Leo Slezak – Count de Latour
 Lucie Englisch – Lucienne
 Rudolf Carl – Bijou
 Hans Thimig – Pierre Touche, village barber
 Richard Eybner – Marquis de Corcy
 Fritz Imhoff – Mayor
 Joe Furtner – Faviere, Corcy's Secretary
 Tibor Halmay – Ballet Master
 Carl Hauser – Policeman
 Irmgard Alberti – Old Woman with love potion
 Hans-Heinz Bollzmann – Singer

External links

1936 films
1930s historical comedy films
1936 musical comedy films
Austrian historical comedy films
Austrian musical comedy films
Swiss historical comedy films
Swiss musical comedy films
1930s German-language films
Films directed by Karel Lamač
Films set in Paris
Films set in the 18th century
Films based on operas
Works about Louis XV
Cultural depictions of Louis XV
Cultural depictions of Madame de Pompadour
1930s historical musical films
Austrian historical musical films